Kailari  is a rural Municipality in Kailali District in Sudurpashchim Province of Nepal. It is surrounded by Bajani Municipality In the East , Dhangadhi Sub Metropolitan City in the West , Gauriganga Municipality and Ghodaghodi Municipality in the North and Uttar Pradesh , India in the South .

See also 
 Kailali District
 Dhangadhi
 Lamki Chuha Municipality
 Sudurpashchim Province

References

Rural municipalities in Kailali District
Municipalities of Nepal
Rural municipalities of Nepal established in 2017